Italy competed at the 1974 European Athletics Indoor Championships in Gothenburg, Sweden, from 9 to 10 March 1974.

Medalists
In this edition of the championships, Italy did not win any medals.

Top eight
Three Italian athletes reached the top eight in this edition of the championships.
Men

Women
In this edition of the championships, no Italian woman reached the top eight.

See also
 Italy national athletics team

References

External links
 EAA official site 

1974
1974 European Athletics Indoor Championships
1974 in Italian sport